Hezarrud-e Olya (also Romanized as Hezārrūd-e ‘Olyā) is a village in Ab Bar Rural District of the Central District of Tarom County, Zanjan province, Iran. At the 2006 National Census, its population was 1,191 in 264 households. The following census in 2011 counted 1,188 people in 315 households. The latest census in 2016 showed a population of 1,044 people in 305 households; it was the largest village in its rural district.

References 

Tarom County

Populated places in Zanjan Province

Populated places in Tarom County